The Huguenot Schoolhouse, also known as District Schoolhouse No. 3, the 1863 Schoolhouse and the Town of Deerpark Museum, is located on South Grange Road a short distance from US 209 in Huguenot, a hamlet of the Town of Deerpark in Orange County, New York, United States. It was built in 1863, and is a large, one-story, Greek Revival style masonry building.  It closed as a school in 1961, and currently serves as a local historic museum.

It was added to the National Register of Historic Places in 1997, the only property in the town of Deerpark so recognized besides the remnants of the Delaware and Hudson Canal.

See also

National Register of Historic Places listings in Orange County, New York

References

External links
 1862 Schoolhouse - official site

One-room schoolhouses in New York (state)
Museums in Orange County, New York
History museums in New York (state)
Schools in Orange County, New York
School buildings on the National Register of Historic Places in New York (state)
National Register of Historic Places in Orange County, New York
School buildings completed in 1863
Education museums in the United States
Defunct schools in New York (state)